The 2002–03 season was the 123rd season of competitive football by Rangers.

Overview
Rangers played a total of 50 competitive matches during the 2002–03 season. They won their seventh domestic treble in manager Alex McLeish's first full season in charge, having taken over from Dick Advocaat the previous season. The league championship was won on goal difference in the last match of the season with a 6–1 win against Dunfermline Athletic. The club finished on +73 GD, just one ahead of Celtic.

The League Cup was won with a 2–1 final win against Celtic and the Scottish Cup with a 1–0 win against Dundee. Despite domestic success, Rangers crashed out of Europe at the first round stage to little known Czech team Victoria Zizkov losing on the away goals rule.

Players

Squad information

Transfers

In

Total spending: £6m

Out

Total spending: £6.75m

Player statistics

Goal scorers

Disciplinary record

Club

Board of directors

Coaching staff

Other staff

Matches

Scottish Premier League

UEFA Cup

Scottish Cup

League Cup

Friendlies

Competitions

Overall

Scottish Premier League

Standings

Results summary

Results by round

References

Rangers F.C. seasons
Rangers
Scottish football championship-winning seasons